The Prison is a 2017 South Korean prison action film directed by Na Hyun and starring Han Suk-kyu and Kim Rae-won. It was released on March 23, 2017.

Plot 
Story about a former detective Song Yoo-gun (Kim Rae-won) who enters a prison as a convict in order to meet a man who is known as "The King" among the inmates, so he can reveal the truth about his older sibling's death.

Cast

Main 
 Han Suk-kyu as Jung Ik-ho
 Kim Rae-won as Song Yoo-gun

Supporting 
 Jung Woong-in as Governor Kang 
 Jo Jae-yoon as Lee Hong-pyo 
 Kim Sung-kyun as Dr. Kim 
 Shin Sung-rok as Chang-gil
 Lee Geung-young as Head correctional officer Bae

Others 

 Han Sung-Yong as Gye-shik
 Han Joo-wan
 Cha Yup as Baek-jung
 Choi Sung-won
 Song Kyung-chul as Mr. Yang
 Kwak Min-ho as Hak-gyu
 Park Jin-woo as Teacher Oh
 Jeon Bae-soo
 Lee Chang-hee as Control room prison officer 1
 Na Kwang-hoon
 Yeon Song-ha
 Kim Kwang-hyun
 Seo Ho-chul
 Yoo Jung-ho as Seo Ki-tae
 Hyun Bong-shik as Agupae
 Kim Seung-hoon
 Park Jong-soo
 Byun Jung-hyun
 Lee Yong-jik
 Yun Byung-hee
 Bae Myung-jin
 Kang Shin-il
 Lee Sang-min

Production 
The film marks the directing debut of Na Hyun, a veteran scriptwriter in the Korean film industry.

According to its distribution company Showbox, "The Prison" has been sold to 62 different countries. Showbox has sealed several deals on the film. After the film's launch at AFM, It will go to Well Go USA for North America, JBG Pictures for Australia, New Zealand and the UK, Lemon Tree for China, Viva Communication for the Philippines, and Movie Cloud for Taiwan. Showbox held a market screening for film on February 11, 2017 during EFM.

"The Prison" was invited to compete in the Brussels International Fantastic Film Festival that ran from April 4–16, 2017 and the Far East Film Festival that ran from April 21–29, 2017 in Udine, Italy.

Test shoots began on January 27, 2016. Filming began on February 14 and ended on May 22, 2016.

References

External links 
 The Prison at Well Go USA Entertainment
 
 
 
 The Prison at Naver
 The Prison at Daum

2017 films
2010s Korean-language films
South Korean prison films
2017 crime action films
Showbox films
South Korean crime action films
2010s prison films
2010s South Korean films